Huckleberry Finn (1931) is an American pre-Code comedy film directed by Norman Taurog and starring Jackie Coogan as Tom Sawyer and Junior Durkin as Huckleberry Finn.  The picture was based upon the 1884 novel The Adventures of Huckleberry Finn by Mark Twain.

Cast
 Jackie Coogan as Tom Sawyer
 Junior Durkin as Huckleberry Finn
 Mitzi Green as Becky Thatcher
 Jackie Searl as Sid Sawyer
 Clarence Muse as Jim
 Eugene Pallette as Duke of Bridgewater
 Oscar Apfel as The King
 Clara Blandick as Aunt Polly
 Jane Darwell as Widow Douglas
 Warner Richmond as Pap Finn
 Charlotte Henry as Mary Jane
 Lillian Harmer as Miss Watson
 Guy Oliver as Judge Thatcher
 Edward LeSaint as Doc Robinson (uncredited)
 Frank McGlynn Sr. as Teacher (uncredited)

Production
This is an adaptation of the classic novel Adventures of Huckleberry Finn by Mark Twain and is a follow-up to Tom Sawyer (1930). Omitting the entire issue of whether or not Huck ought to turn the slave Jim back in after Jim escapes his owners, it concentrated mostly on the comedy in the novel, and turned Jim into the typical comic "darkie" stereotype of that era.

The film was made as a follow-up to Paramount's  Tom Sawyer, which had been released a year earlier with substantially the same cast and became the top-grossing film of 1930.

However, as happened with Tom Sawyer, the 1931 Huckleberry Finn was superseded only eight years later by MGM's far more faithful The Adventures of Huckleberry Finn, starring Mickey Rooney as Huck, Rex Ingram as Jim, Walter Connolly as the King, and William Frawley as the Duke.

Reception
According to Leonard Maltin, the film is "charming, but very, very dated".

See also
The House That Shadows Built (1931 Paramount promotional film)

References

External links

 
 
 

1931 films
1931 comedy films
American black-and-white films
1930s English-language films
Paramount Pictures films
Films based on Adventures of Huckleberry Finn
Films set in the 19th century
American comedy films
Films directed by Norman Taurog
1930s American films